This is a list of people notable in the field of cardiology. Presented along with their year of birth, death, nationality, notability, and reference(s).

Cardiologists

See also
List of cardiac pharmaceutical agents

References
32. http://armenianweekly.com/2016/04/06/hagop-janessian-1942-2016/

Cardiologists
Lists of physicians